This is a list of 19th-century iron smelting operations in Australia.

The earliest commercial iron ore smelting took place in 1848.  There was an increase in pig iron prices in the early 1870s, which led to the formation of a number of colonial-era iron-making ventures in Australia.  A world-wide shortage caused the price of imported pig-iron to increase, from £4 10s per ton in 1870 to £9 per ton in 1873 greatly advantaging locally manufactured iron. This period has been called, 'Australia's age of iron.' However, the high prices did not last long, as global iron-making capacity increased, and pig-iron was once again imported cheaply as ballast in sailing ships returning from England to Australia. After 1884, there was no commercial iron smelting in Australia, until William Sandford built a modern blast furnace at Lithgow in 1907.

Trial smelting in foundries 
Trial smelting took place in foundries, typically using existing cupola furnaces usually used to melt iron to manufacture castings. Such furnaces could be adapted to make pig iron if charged with iron ore, coke or charcoal, and some limestone as a flux.

Direct reduction furnaces 
Direct reduction furnaces operate at temperatures below the melting point of iron and make a semi-solid product known as sponge iron. with molten slag as the waste product.

Blast furnaces 
Blast furnaces operate at temperatures above the melting point of iron and make molten pig iron, with molten slag as the waste product. In the 19th-century, furnaces used  either hot-blast technology—like modern blast furnaces, in which the blast air is preheated to a high temperature—or the older cold-blast technology.

There were both cold-blast and hot-blast furnaces in 19th-century Australia. With only one exception—British and Tasmanian Charcoal Iron Company—all the furnaces were originally built as cold-blast furnaces. A cold air blast made it more difficult—but not impossible—to achieve a furnace temperature that allowed molten pig iron and slag to be run from the furnace, avoiding what was known as a 'chilled hearth'. Cold-blast technology was used successfully in some colonial-era blast furnaces—notably the two furnaces at Lal Lal—but it could not be made to work reliably in others. Some furnaces that were initially designed as cold blast—the Fitzroy Iron Works, Tamar Hematite Iron Company, and Lithgow Valley Ironworks—soon switched, with relative success, to hot-blast technology. With the exception of the modified blast furnace at the Fitzroy Iron Works, none of the furnaces recycled furnace off-gas as a fuel source.

Ventures that did not enter operation 
These business ventures were established to smelt iron, but did not build furnaces.

References 

Ironworks and steelworks in Australia